Zamioculcadoideae is a subfamily of flowering plants in the family Araceae that consists of two genera, Zamioculcas and Gonatopus. It was proposed in 2005 by Bogner and Hesse after molecular studies indicated the need for the subfamily. There are also some genetic indications that Stylochaeton should be included in the subfamily.

References

 J. Bogner and M. Hesse (2005). Zamioculcadoideae, a new subfamily of Araceae. Aroideana Volume 28.
 Lidia I. Cabrera, Gerardo A. Salazar, Mark W. Chase, Simon J. Mayo, Josef Bogner and Patricia Dávila, Phylogenetic relationships of aroids and duckweeds (Araceae) inferred from coding and noncoding plastid DNA, American Journal of Botany, 95:1153-1165

Araceae
Alismatales subfamilies